Cedar Lawn Cemetery is a rural cemetery in Paterson, New Jersey, and is also considered one of the finest Victorian cemeteries in the USA. Cedar Lawn Cemetery officially opened in September 1867, and recorded its first burial on September 27, 1867.  

Cedar Lawn is located on a multi-acre plot bordered by Lakeview Avenue (CR 624), Crooks Avenue, I-80, and NJ-20; the plot is also home to the adjacent Calvary Cemetery, a Roman Catholic burial ground. Over 85,000 people are interned at Cedar Lawn. 

During the Revolutionary War, the cemetery was farmland, owned by Annatje Von Riper, her son Henry Doremus, and Hessel Peterse. The British army plundered the three households on its march through New Jersey in November 1776.

Noted interments
John Bancker Aycrigg (1798–1856), represented New Jersey in the United States House of Representatives from 1837 to 1839 and 1841 to 1843.
William Warren Barbour (1888-1943) - U.S. Senator from New Jersey and amateur Heavyweight boxing champion.
Charles Dyer Beckwith - (1838 – 1921) American Republican Party politician from New Jersey who represented New Jersey's 5th congressional district from 1889 to 1891.
Nicholas M. Butler (April 2, 1862 – December 7, 1947) - co-winner with Jane Addams of the 1931 Nobel Peace Prize.  President of Columbia University from 1902 to 1945 and of the Carnegie Endowment for International Peace from 1925 to 1945.  Republican Party nominee for Vice President of the United States under President William Howard Taft in 1912, when the nominated vice presidential candidate James S. Sherman died in office a few days before the election.
Cornelius A. Cadmus (1844-1902), represented New Jersey's 5th congressional district from 1891-1895.
Philemon Dickerson (1788-1862) - United States congressman and 12th Governor of New Jersey, from 1836 to 1837.
Dow H. Drukker (1872-1963), represented New Jersey's 6th congressional district from 1914-1919.
John W. Griggs (1849-1927), 29th Governor of New Jersey, from 1896 to 1898.  U.S. Attorney General 1898-1901.
Abraham Godwin (1763-1835), Fife Major American Revolution
Abraham Godwin Jr (1792-1849) first Lieutenant of the expedition to Canada in 1812 led by Generals Brown and Izard
Garret Hobart (1844-1899), 24th Vice President of the United States.
Jennie Tuttle Hobart (1849-1941), wife of the former U.S. Vice President.
Ted Horn (1910-1948) - American race car driver who won the AAA National Championship in 1946, 1947, 1948.
William Hughes (1872-1918), politician who represented New Jersey in both houses of the United States Congress.
Charles Joughin (1878-1956), Chief baker aboard the ill-fated ocean liner RMS Titanic. Known as the last survivor to leave the sinking ship and surviving for nearly two hours in the freezing waters.
Eugene W. Leake (1876-1959), represented New Jersey's 9th congressional district from 1907 to 1909.
Amos H. Radcliffe (1870-1950), Mayor of Paterson, New Jersey from 1916 - 1919, and represented New Jersey's 7th congressional district from 1919 to 1923.
Julian Rix (1850-1903), noted American landscape artist.
John Ryle (1817–1887), Industrialist and prominent silk manufacturer who pioneered the textile and is frequently referred to as the "Father of the U.S. Silk Industry", who also served as Mayor of Paterson, New Jersey from 1869-1870. Ryle was also the Founder and First President of the Passaic Water Company, later the Passaic Valley Water Commission. 
Mary Danforth Ryle (1833-1904), Philanthropist who donated millions to Paterson and other New Jersey historical and cultural institutions.  
William Ryle (1834-1881), Industrialist who was reputed to be the world's largest importer of European silk in the United States in the late 19th century.  William Ryle married Mary Danforth, who later donated millions to various Paterson and New Jersey institutions and charities.  William Ryle was the nephew of John Ryle, widely regarded as the "Father of the U.S. Silk Industry."
James F. Stewart (1851-1904), represented New Jersey's 5th congressional district in the United States House of Representatives from to 1895 to 1903.
There is one Commonwealth war grave of a Royal Canadian Air Force airman of World War II.

References

External links 
Political Graveyard: Cedar Lawn Cemetery
The Cemetery Project: Cedar Lawn Cemetery

1867 establishments in New Jersey
Cemeteries in Passaic County, New Jersey
Geography of Paterson, New Jersey
Buildings and structures in Paterson, New Jersey
Rural cemeteries